"Burning" is a song by English singer Sam Smith. It was written by Smith, Jason Boyd, Dominic Jordan and Jimmy Giannos, with production handled by Jimmy Napes and Steve Fitzmaurice. The song was released on 27 October 2017 through Capitol Records, as a promotional single from Smith's second studio album, The Thrill of It All (2017).

Commercial performance
On 3 November 2017, "Burning" debuted on the UK Singles Chart at number sixty-three, selling 5,455 copies. The next week, it would be number thirty-four with sales of 10,502 units. However, "Burning" did not appear on the UK Singles Chart because of the rule that primary artists can have only three concurrent entries.

Charts

Certifications

References

External links

2017 songs
2017 singles
Sam Smith (singer) songs
Capitol Records singles
Songs written by Sam Smith (singer)
Songs written by Poo Bear
Songs written by Dominic Jordan
Songs written by James Giannos